The 2018 Thailand National Games, officially known as the XLVI Thailand National Games  and commonly known as Jiang Hai Games, was a national multi-sport event of Thailand held between 18 and 28 November 2018 in Chiang Rai, Thailand.

Host selection

Development and preparation

Venues

The Games

Ceremonies
The opening ceremony of the 2018 Thailand National Games was held at the Chiang Rai Province Central Stadium on 18 November 2018, and the closing ceremony was on 28 November 2018

Sports
The 2018 Thailand National Games featured events in 45 sports.

Aquatics

Football

Handball

Rugby football

Shooting

Tennis

Volleyball

Participating Provincial Sports Associations

Medal table

External links
 Chiang Rai 2018

National Games
Thailand National Games
National Games
Thailand National Games
National Games